ccHost is a web-based media hosting engine upon which Creative Commons' ccMixter remix web community is built. The software is written in PHP and uses the MySQL database server. In 2005 it won Linux World's award for Best Open Source solution.

Nathan Willis wrote:

References

Further reading

External links

ccHost at SlideShare
Artisan Website Creator
Vsis Specialized In Hosting

Content management systems
Creative Commons
Website management